Gula may refer to:
 Gula (animal), Dharug language name for the koala bear
 Gula (crater), a crater on Ganymede
 Gula (ethnic group), a tribal people living in western Liberia
 Gula (surname), which see for a list of people of that name
 Gula language (disambiguation), several African languages
 Gula Mons, a volcano on Venus
 Gula, Indonesia and Malaysian language for Sugar
 "Gula", a song by Progressive house artist deadmau5 from the 2014 album "while (1<2)"
 Gula, Latin name for the vice of gluttony, one of the Seven Deadly Sins
 Gullah, a people of African origin living on the islands and coastal regions of Georgia and South Carolina
 Gula (goddess), a Mesopotamian goddess of medicine
 Kudurru of Gula, a boundary stone for the goddess

See also
 Gular (disambiguation)